In mathematics, the Shafarevich theorem, named for Igor Shafarevich, may refer to:

Néron–Ogg–Shafarevich criterion
Golod–Shafarevich theorem about class field towers
Grothendieck–Ogg–Shafarevich formula
Shafarevich's theorem on solvable Galois groups
Shafarevich–Weil theorem about the fundamental class in class field theory
Shafarevich's theorem on elliptic curves with good reduction outside a given set.